is a retired Japanese backstroke, butterfly and medley swimmer. She represented her native country at the 2000 Summer Olympics in Sydney, Australia. She is best known for winning two gold medals at the 1999 Summer Universiade in Palma de Mallorca. She also competed twice on Sasuke in the 28th and 29th competitions. In the 28th competition, she failed the Quintuple Step. In the 29th competition, she failed the Hedgehog.

External links
 

 

 

1980 births
Living people
Olympic swimmers of Japan
Swimmers at the 2000 Summer Olympics
People from Osaka Prefecture
Japanese female freestyle swimmers
Japanese female backstroke swimmers
Japanese female breaststroke swimmers
Japanese female butterfly swimmers
Japanese female medley swimmers
World Aquatics Championships medalists in swimming
Asian Games medalists in swimming
Swimmers at the 1998 Asian Games
Swimmers at the 2010 Asian Games
Medalists at the 1998 Asian Games
Medalists at the 2010 Asian Games
Universiade medalists in swimming
Asian Games gold medalists for Japan
Asian Games silver medalists for Japan
Universiade gold medalists for Japan
Universiade silver medalists for Japan
Medalists at the 1999 Summer Universiade
Medalists at the 2001 Summer Universiade
21st-century Japanese women
20th-century Japanese women